Daniel Steen Varen (14 May 1908 - 19 February 1991) was a Norwegian politician for the Liberal Party.

He served as a deputy representative to the Norwegian Parliament from Aust-Agder during the term 1969–1973.

References

1908 births
1991 deaths
Liberal Party (Norway) politicians
Deputy members of the Storting